William Horner Harper (June 14, 1889 – June 17, 1951) was a Major League Baseball pitcher.

External links

Major League Baseball pitchers
St. Louis Browns players
Pontiac Indians players
Decatur Commodores players
Cedar Rapids Rabbits players
Baseball players from Missouri
1889 births
1951 deaths
People from Mississippi County, Missouri
Missouri Tigers baseball players